The Agawa River is a river in Algoma District, Ontario, Canada which empties into Agawa Bay on Lake Superior at the community of Agawa Bay, south of Wawa, Ontario.

History
The Agawa Rock pictographs are located on a rock face extending into Lake Superior in Agawa Bay. Some paintings are at least 1500 years old, while others may only date back to the 1800s. "Aagawaa" means "sheltered place" in the Ojibwe language.

The scenery of this region inspired a number of paintings by the Group of Seven.

Economy
The Algoma Central Railway runs an excursion train which leaves Sault Ste. Marie, Ontario and travels through the Agawa Canyon. Agawa Bay and the lower parts of the river are located in Lake Superior Provincial Park.

Tributaries
Little Agawa River
Eleven Mile Creek
Blackspruce Creek
Weichel Creek
Parch Creek
Regan River
Sane Creek

Settlements
Agawa Bay
Canyon
O'Connor
Eton
Millwood

See also
List of Ontario rivers

References

Rivers of Algoma District
Tributaries of Lake Superior